Devdas Apte (born 15 June 1934 in Vadodara, Gujarat) is an Indian politician from Bharatiya Janata Party and a former member of the Parliament of India representing Jharkhand in the Rajya Sabha, the Upper House of the Parliament. He sat in Parliament from 2 July 2002 to 9 April 2008, when he retired. The son of Shri Kashi Nath and Shrimati Girija Apte, he received a B.A. from Nagpur University, Nagpur, and served as a social worker before going into politics.

References

External links
 Alphabetical List Of Former Members Of Rajya Sabha Since 1952; JavaScript required to navigate to Apte's page (listed as member #103)

Rajya Sabha members from Jharkhand
Living people
1934 births
Rashtrasant Tukadoji Maharaj Nagpur University alumni
People from Vadodara
Bharatiya Janata Party politicians from Jharkhand
Rajya Sabha members from the Bharatiya Janata Party